Serrata tuii is a species of sea snail, a marine gastropod mollusk in the family Marginellidae, the margin snails.

Description
The size of the shell of a Serrata tuii sea snail reaches 10 mm.

Distribution
This marine species occurs off New Caledonia.

References

 Boyer F. (2008). The genus Serrata Jousseaume, 1875 (Caenogastropoda: Marginellidae) in New Caledonia. Mémoires du Muséum National d'Histoire Naturelle 196 : 389-436 page(s): 418
 Cossignani T. (2006). Marginellidae & Cystiscidae of the World. L'Informatore Piceno. 408pp

Marginellidae
Gastropods described in 2001